Brossard is a surname. Notable people with the surname include:

 Chandler Brossard (1922–1993), American novelist, writer, editor, and teacher
 Emma Brossard (1928–2007), American professor of politics and government and noted expert on the Venezuelan oil industry
 Geneviève Brossard de Beaulieu (fl. c. 1770-1815), French painter
 Georges Brossard (born 1940), Canadian entomologist
 Nicole Brossard (born 1943), French Canadian formalist poet and novelist
 Sébastien de Brossard (1655–1730), French composer 

Fictional characters:
 Pierre Brossard, a fictional character in the novel The Statement, by Brian Moore, and the film adaptation

See also
 Sébastien de Brossard (1655–1730), French music theorist and baroque composer